Carattino is an Italian surname. Notable people with the surname include:

Antonio Carattino (born 1923), Italian sailor
Domenico Carattino (1920–2004), Italian sailor
Giuseppe Carattino (1919–2014), Italian sailor

Italian-language surnames